Ricardo Dias Acosta (born 15 December 1985), commonly known as Ricardinho, is a Brazilian footballer who plays for Paysandu as a midfielder.

Club career
Born in Rosário do Sul, Rio Grande do Sul, Ricardinho finished his formation with Juventude, but made his senior debuts with Iraty in 2006.

Ricardinho was subsequently loaned to Ceará, Caxias and Linense, joining the latter permanently in 2010. In 2011, he moved to XV de Piracicaba.

On 13 May 2011 Ricardinho was loaned to Londrina, returning to Nhô Quim in September. On 9 May of the following year he moved to Ponte Preta, also in a temporary deal.

Ricardinho made his Série A debut on 10 June 2012, coming on as a second-half substitute for Cicinho in a 0–0 away draw against Figueirense. On the 24th he scored his first goal in the category, netting the winner in a 2–1 success at Botafogo.

On 20 December 2012 Ricardinho agreed a deal with Ceará.

Honours

Club
Botafogo
 Campeonato Brasileiro Série B: 2021

Ceará
Campeonato Cearense: 2013, 2014
Copa do Nordeste: 2015

Linense
Campeonato Paulista Série A2: 2010

XV de Piracicaba
Campeonato Paulista Série A2: 2011

Londrina
Campeonato Paranaense Série Prata: 2011

Individual
Campeonato Cearense Best right midfielder: 2013
Copa do Nordeste Best right midfielder: 2014

References

External links
Ceará official profile 

1985 births
Living people
Sportspeople from Rio Grande do Sul
Brazilian footballers
Association football midfielders
Campeonato Brasileiro Série A players
Campeonato Brasileiro Série B players
Campeonato Brasileiro Série C players
Iraty Sport Club players
Ceará Sporting Club players
Sociedade Esportiva e Recreativa Caxias do Sul players
Clube Atlético Linense players
Esporte Clube XV de Novembro (Piracicaba) players
Londrina Esporte Clube players
Associação Atlética Ponte Preta players
Botafogo de Futebol e Regatas players
Paysandu Sport Club players
Saudi First Division League players
Ettifaq FC players
Brazilian expatriate footballers
Brazilian expatriate sportspeople in Saudi Arabia
Expatriate footballers in Saudi Arabia